Trevarth is a hamlet in the parish of Lanner, Cornwall, England, United Kingdom. The name Trevarth comes from the Cornish language words tre, meaning 'farm' or 'settlement', and margh, meaning 'horse', an element it shares with nearby Carn Marth.

References

Hamlets in Cornwall